Bishop score, also Bishop's score or cervix score, is a pre-labor scoring system to assist in predicting whether induction of labor will be required. It has also been used to assess the likelihood of spontaneous preterm delivery. The Bishop Score was developed by Professor Emeritus of Obstetrics and Gynecology, Dr. Edward Bishop, and was first published in August 1964.

Components
The total score is calculated by assessing the following five components on manual vaginal examination by a trained professional:

Cervical dilation in centimeters
Cervical effacement as a percentage
Cervical consistency by provider assessment/judgement
Cervical position
Fetal station, the position of the fetal head in relation to the pelvic bones

The Bishop score grades patients who would be most likely to achieve a successful induction. The duration of labor is inversely correlated with the Bishop score;  “A Bishop score of 9 conveys a high likelihood for a successful induction. For research purposes, a Bishop score of 4 or less identifies an unfavorable cervix and may be an indication for cervical ripening.”

Excerpt From
Williams Obstetrics, 25th Edition
F. Gary Cunningham, Kenneth J. Leveno, Steven L. Bloom, Jodi S. Dashe, Barbara L. Hoffman, Brian M. Casey and Catherine Y. Spong
This material may be protected by copyright.

They can be remembered with the mnemonic: Call PEDS For Parturition = Cervical Position, Effacement, Dilation, Softness; Fetal Station.

Scoring
The examiner assigns a score to each component of 0 to 2 or 0 to 3. The highest possible score is 13 and the lowest possible score is 0.

Interpretation

A Bishop's score 6 or less often indicates that induction (e.g., with controlled-release prostaglandin E2/prostin gel [Cervidil], intravaginal gel [Prostin], intracervical gel [Prepidil]) is unlikely to be successful. Some sources indicate that only a score of 8 or greater is reliably predictive of a successful induction.

Modified Bishop score
According to the Modified Bishop's pre-induction cervical scoring system, effacement has been replaced by cervical length in cm, with scores as follows: 0 for >3 cm, 1 for >2 cm, 2 for >1 cm, 3 for >0 cm. Cervical length may be easier and more accurate to measure and have less inter-examiner variability.

Another modification for the Bishop's score is the modifiers. Points are added or subtracted according to special circumstances as follows:
 One point is added to the total score for:
 Existence of pre-eclampsia
 Each previous delivery
 One point is subtracted from the total score for:
 Postdate/post-term pregnancy
 Nulliparity (no previous vaginal deliveries)
 PPROM; preterm premature (prelabor) rupture of membranes

See also
 List of obstetric topics
 Fetal fibronectin (fFN)
 Apgar score

References

External links
Online calculator of the Bishop score

Diagnostic obstetrics and gynaecology
Obstetrics
Medical assessment and evaluation instruments
Midwifery
Medical mnemonics